Łumpia  (German Lomp) is a village in the administrative district of Gmina Świątki, within Olsztyn County, Warmian-Masurian Voivodeship, in northern Poland.

References

Villages in Olsztyn County